Omoregie is a surname. Notable people with the surname include: 

David Omoregie (born 1995), Welsh athlete
Elizabeth Omoregie (born 1996), Slovenian handball player
Justin Omoregie (born 2003), Austrian footballer
Omoowa Omoregie, Nigerian taekwondo practitioner
Sunny Omoregie (born 1989), Nigerian footballer